Muhammad Hussain Chandio (Sindhi محمد حسين چانڊيو)  is a Pakistani artist.

Chandio was born in 1974 in Dadu district of Sindh. He obtained his master's degree in Fine Arts from Sindh University Jamshoro. He worked as a lecturer at  Centre of Excellence in Arts and Design, Mehran University of Engineering & Technology, Jamshoro. Chandio owns his own studio in Hyderabad.

Exhibitions

Solo exhibitions 
 2015 - solo show, Gallery 6, Islamabad
 2010 - solo show, Sindh Museum, Hyderabad
 2009 - solo show, Majmua Gallery, Karachi
 2003 - solo show, Heaven House School, Thatta

Group exhibitions 
 2011 - group show, international show in Islamabad
 2011 - group show, Jharokha Gallery, Islamabad
 2010 - group show, Institute of Arts & Design, University of Sindh, Jamshoro
 2009 - group show, Institute of Arts & Design, University of Sindh, Jamshoro
 2009 - group show, Kunj Art Gallery, Karachi
 2008 - international exhibition, University of Sindh, Jamshoro
 2006 - Mehran Colors group show, Art Council, Hyderabad
 Group show, Hyderabad, Karachi, Islamabad

References

Sindhi people
Artists from Sindh
1974 births
Living people